Synchronoff is a 2006 romantic animated short film directed by Catia Peres. The plot follows two characters named Eleanora and Bert who become unsynchronized while dancing and must endeavour to return to the same rhythm. The film was screened at the Bimini Animation Festival, as well as at the Karlovy Vary International Film Festival.

References

External links
 

2000s romance films
2006 films
British animated short films
2000s English-language films
2000s British films